AStory is a Korean drama production company founded in 2004 by Lee Sang-baek together with his friends, drama writer  and director , in Seoul.

List of works

As production company

Scripted

Non-scripted

As script provider

As production proxy

Partnerships

Soundtrack production and distribution
 kakao M (primary partner)
 Plus Media Entertainment

References

Hyunseok Lee

External links
  
  
  

Television production companies of South Korea
Companies based in Seoul
Mass media companies established in 2004
2004 establishments in South Korea
Labels distributed by Kakao M
Companies listed on KOSDAQ
2019 initial public offerings